

The Henschel Hs 298 was a 1940s German rocket-powered air-to-air missile designed by Professor Herbert Wagner of Henschel.

Design and development
The Hs 298 was designed specifically to attack Allied bomber aircraft and was the first missile designed specifically for air-to-air use. It was to be carried on special launch rails by Dornier Do 217s (five missiles) or Focke-Wulf Fw 190s (two missiles) and carried 48 kg (106 lb) of explosive, slightly more than the 40.8 kg warheads carried by unguided BR 21 heavy-calibre air-launched rockets in use from the spring of 1943 onwards. 

The Hs 298 was a mid-wing monoplane with tapered swept back wings and it had a single horizontal stabiliser with twin vertical fins. It used a Kehl-Straßburg MCLOS radio guidance system (the Funkgerät FuG 203-series Kehl transmitter in the launching aircraft, the FuG 230 Straßburg receiver in the ordnance) powered by a propeller-driven (mounted on the nose) electric generator. The missile needed two crew on the launch aircraft to control it, one operator used a reflector-type sight to aim at the target and the other flew the missile using a joystick on the Kehl transmitter, and another sight paired to the first with a servo system.

The only known test firings were carried out on 22 December 1944 with three missiles carried by a Junkers Ju 88G. Only two missiles left the launch rails with one failing to release, of the two released one exploded prematurely and nose-dived into the ground. It was planned to enter mass production in January 1945 but the project was abandoned in favour of the X-4.

Survivors
One Hs 298 is on display at the Royal Air Force Museum Cosford.
One Hs 298 is on display at the Smithsonian National Air and Space Museum Steven F. Udvar-Hazy Center.

Specifications
Wing span – 1.24m (4 ft 1in)
Length – 2.06m (6 ft 9in)
Launch weight – 120 kg (265 lb)
Launch speed – 938 km/h (585 mph)
Cruise speed – 682 km/h (425 mph)

References

World War II guided missiles of Germany
Air-to-air missiles of Germany